Ishrat Fatima (or Ishrat Fatima Saqib) is a former Pakistani newsreader and radio presenter who worked for Pakistan Television and Radio Pakistan. In 2019, she received civil award for her services.

Early life
She was born in Pakistan and she lives in Islamabad she is not anyhow related to muzzafergarh. Her siblings are also a part of media Ayesha Khalid ( VOA) and Bilal Sheikh (BOL).

Career
Ishrat Fatima has had a successful and very popular career as a TV newsreader. She was 'the face' of 9 pm daily Urdu news Khabarnama in the 1980s and 1990s. She started her career from Radio Pakistan hosting a program 'Khel aur Khiladi'. Initially she had gone to PTV for audition for doing a weather segment, but instead was selected by PTV for news segment.

Ishrat Fatima was popularly called 'a poised lady presenting news with elegance'. She seemed to have a great command over Urdu language while presenting the news with an abundance of self-confidence. During an interview to a major Pakistani English-language newspaper, she stressed that she used to put in a tremendous amount of effort, time and energy in rehearsing before she actually went on-screen. In her rehearsals, she would verify everything and used to make sure that her presentation would have no errors in it.

Personal life
She got married in 1996 to Saqib Waheed. They are parents of two children Muhammad Shah Mir and Royam Saqib.

Awards and recognition
Pride of Performance Award in 2019 by the President of Pakistan.
Tamgha-i-Imtiaz (Medal of Excellence) by the Government of Pakistan
Nigar Award

References

External links
 This presenter of Urdu news was a celebrity in South-Asian journalism when even the word 'celebrity' wasn't commonly-used.
 Khalid Hameed & Ishrat Fatima Still Reading News 
 PTV Newscaster Ishrat Saqib robbed
 Ishrat Fatima on Twitter

Pakistan Television Corporation people
Pakistani television newsreaders and news presenters
Recipients of Tamgha-e-Imtiaz
Nigar Award winners
Recipients of the Pride of Performance
Pakistani radio presenters
Pakistani women radio presenters